The Paul Lawrie Match Play was a golf tournament on the European Tour that was played from 2015 to 2017 in Europe. The inaugural tournament was played from 30 July to 2 August 2015 at Murcar Links Golf Club in Aberdeen. The tournament's host was eight-time European Tour winner and 1999 Open Champion Paul Lawrie.

The event was a 64-man single-elimination match play tournament, with one round played on each of the first two days and two rounds on the last two. The European Tour's exemption categories were used to select most of the field, with four spots reserved for invitations and three for the leading three non-exempt players in the Race to Dubai rankings. The thirty-two players in the field who were highest in the Race to Dubai were seeded one to thirty-two and prevented from facing each other in the first round; the remainder were randomly drawn into the bracket.

After changing title sponsor every year and relocating from Scotland to Germany in 2017, the tournament was quietly dropped from 2018 European Tour calendar probably due to financial reasons.

Winners

References

External links
Coverage on the European Tour's official site

Former European Tour events
Golf tournaments in Scotland
Golf tournaments in Germany
Defunct golf tournaments
Recurring sporting events established in 2015
Recurring sporting events disestablished in 2017
2015 establishments in Scotland
2017 disestablishments in Germany